Ethio Electric Sport Club (Amharic: ኢትዮ ኤሌክትሪክ ስፖርት ክለብ), also known as EEPCO or Mebrat Hail, is an Ethiopian football club based in Addis Ababa. The club currently plays in the Ethiopian Higher League, the second division of Ethiopian football.

History

Beginnings 
Ethio-Electric was found as Ethiopian Electric Power Sport Club in 1960 (1953 EC.) by the Ethiopian Electric Power Corporation. It's one of the most historic clubs in Ethiopian football

In September 2018 the club announced sweeping changes at all levels of the club including hiring former Ethio-Electric star player Anwar Yasin as the club's manager.

Ethiopian Premier League 
Ethio-Electric won the inaugural Ethiopian Premier League during the 1997–98 Season, known as Mebrat Hail at the time it was the club's second overall title. The club also enjoyed a great 2000–01 premier league campaign as their star striker Yordanos Abay scored a record 24 goals during the season helping Ethio-Electric to its second Premier League title (3rd overall title). His record would stand 16 years until the 2016–17 season when Dedebit striker Getaneh Kebede scored 25 goals surpassed his mark. The 2001–02 season saw Ethio-Electric picked as favorites to repeat as champions, but unfortunately fail to meet expectations as they finished behind eventual champions St. George. in 2010, the club hired former Lokomotiv Sofia and Bulgarian National team player Yordan Stoikov as its head coach.

Recent Troubles 
In 2016 Ethio-Electric beat Saint George S.C. to lift the club's third Addis Ababa City Cup at Addis Ababa Stadium. Ethio-Electric was relegated from the Ethiopian Premier League after the 2017–18 season.

Stadium 
Ethio-Electric's home stadium is Mebrat Hail Stadium.

Finances 
The club has been, from its inception, financially supported by the Ethiopian Mebrat Haile (now called the Ethiopian Electric Power Corporation). In 2021, in an efforts to be more financially independent, the club constructed shops around its stadium at a cost of 2.6 million birr.

Departments 
The women's team is Managed by Eyerusalem Negash as of 2018.

Active Departments 

 Women's Football Team
 Football Team (U17)

Honors

Domestic

League 
 Ethiopian Premier League: 3

1993, 1998, 2001

Cups 
Ethiopian Cup: 4

 1971, 1972, 1976, 2001

Ethiopian Super Cup: 3

 1993, 1998, 2001
Addis Ababa City Cup: 3
 2005, 2006, 2016

African
CAF Champions League: 2 appearances
1999 – First Round
2002 – Preliminary Round

African Cup of Champions Clubs: 1 appearance
1994 – First Round

CAF Cup: 3 appearances

1996 – First Round
1998 – Second Round
2001 – Second Round

Club Officials 
CEO:  Lemma Bedele

President:  Chala Aman

Chairman:  Araya Haile

Technical Directors:  Tesfaye Zergaw and  Golalit Firde

Coaching and Medical staff 
Manager: Kifle Boltena

Assistant Coach(s): Mesfin Shebeshe and  Lemma Debele

Goalkeeping Coach: Daniel Tesfaye

Team Leader: Aklilu Gebremariam

Former Managers 

Berhanu Bayu
 Anwar Yasin 
Addisu Negash 
Bogale Zewdu
Wondimu Bekele
Hagos Desta
Yordan Stoikov (2010–14)

Former players 
 Yordanos Abay
Didier Kavumbagu
Anwar Yasin
Mulualem Tilahun
Radi Abreha
Ibrahim Fofano
 Bereket Tessema

References

External links
Team profile – Soccerway.com

Football clubs in Ethiopia
Football clubs in Addis Ababa
Association football clubs established in 1962
1962 establishments in Ethiopia
Works association football clubs in Ethiopia